Malaysian Bulk Carriers Berhad was incorporated on 19 November 1988. In 1995, it became the vehicle for a collaboration between Kuok Group and Global Maritime Ventures Berhad, a marine venture capital investment company funded by the Malaysian Government through Bank Industri & Teknologi Malaysia Berhad.

On 2 December 2003, MBC was listed on the Main Board of Bursa Malaysia. The MBC Group is one of the largest shipping enterprises in Malaysia and one of a handful of Malaysian shipping companies engaged in international shipping using its own fleet of vessels. MBC presently owns and operates a fleet of vessels comprising dry bulk carriers and product tankers. Apart from shipowning and operation, MBC is also engaged in ship management and operates a container depot.

Subsidiaries
Pacific Ship-Managers Sdn Bhd
PSM Perkapalan Sdn Bhd

External links

1988 establishments in Malaysia
Companies listed on Bursa Malaysia
Transport companies established in 1988
Malaysian companies established in 1988